Tuğçe Oylumlu (born ) is a Turkish individual rhythmic gymnast. She represents her nation at international competitions. She competed at world championships, including at the 2005 World Rhythmic Gymnastics Championships.

She is the twin sister of Gizem Oylumlu, who is also a Turkish international gymnast.

References

External links
 Interview

1988 births
Living people
Turkish rhythmic gymnasts
Place of birth missing (living people)
Twin sportspeople